Sviatlana (Svetlana) Zhidko (born 15 May 1980 in Baranavichy) is a Belarusian freestyle swimmer. She competed in three events at the 1996 Summer Olympics.

References

External links
 

1980 births
Living people
Belarusian female freestyle swimmers
Olympic swimmers of Belarus
Swimmers at the 1996 Summer Olympics
People from Baranavichy
Sportspeople from Brest Region